Anthony Lawlor (born 13 June 1959) is an Irish former Fine Gael politician who served as a Senator for the Agricultural Panel from 2018 to 2020. He served as a Teachta Dála (TD) for the Kildare North constituency from 2011 to 2016.

Early life
A son of Tony and Patsy Lawlor, he was educated at Multyfarnham Agricultural College, University College Dublin and National University of Ireland, Maynooth.

He was co-opted to Kildare County Council in 1998, following the death of his mother Patsy. He was elected in 1999 as an Independent Councillor for the Naas local electoral area. He did not stand for election in 2004. In 2009, he was re-elected as a Councillor, this time as a member of Fine Gael.

Politics
Lawlor was elected as a Fine Gael TD for the Kildare North constituency at the 2011 general election.

On 11 December 2012, Lawlor introduced a bill in the Oireachtas intended to outlaw the clocking of vehicle odometers, which is not currently illegal in Ireland.

He lost his seat at the 2016 general election. He subsequently failed to get elected to Seanad Éireann in April 2016.

He was elected to 25th Seanad on the Agricultural Panel in a by-election on 27 April 2018. The vacancy was caused by the resignation of Senator Trevor Ó Clochartaigh. He was an unsuccessful candidate for Kildare North at the 2020 general election. He did not contest the 2020 Seanad election.

See also
Families in the Oireachtas

References

 

1959 births
Living people
Alumni of University College Dublin
Alumni of Maynooth University
Fine Gael TDs
Independent politicians in Ireland
Irish farmers
Local councillors in County Kildare
Members of the 31st Dáil
Politicians from County Kildare
Members of the 25th Seanad
Fine Gael senators